Warrior Princess may refer to:

"Warrior Princess", the 2014 Mongolian hit film about the life of Queen Anu
Xena: Warrior Princess, a 1995-2001 American television series 
"The Warrior Princess" (Hercules: The Legendary Journeys), an episode of Hercules: The Legendary Journeys
Xena: Warrior Princess (comics)
X-wing Rogue Squadron: The Warrior Princess, a 1996 story arc of the X-wing: Rogue Squadron comics series
Diana: Warrior Princess, a 2003 roleplaying game by Heliograph Incorporated
Warrior Princess: A U.S. Navy SEAL's Journey to Coming out Transgender, a 2013 memoir of Kristin Beck, a former United States Navy SEAL who came out as a trans woman
nickname of English professional kickboxer Ruqsana Begum (born 1983)

See also
Women warriors in literature and culture
List of female action heroes
List of women warriors in folklore